Michael A. Khouri is a former Commissioner of the Federal Maritime Commission. He was nominated by President Obama and confirmed by the U.S. Senate in December 2009. President Trump designated him as Acting Chairman on January 23, 2017, and then designated him as Chairman on March 3, 2019. He was succeeded by Chairman Maffei in March 2021.

Early life
Khouri was born in Louisville in the U.S. state of Kentucky. He is the son of a Lebanese-American father and German-English mother. Following military service in Texas, the family moved to Paducah, Kentucky. He graduated from Paducah Tilghman High School. He attended Tulane University in Louisiana earning a B.A. in Economics and later earned a J.D. from the University of Louisville in Kentucky.

Career
Khouri is a career veteran in the maritime industry from positions held in marine vessel operations, legal, and executive general management assignments. The marine companies include Crounse Corporation, American Commercial Lines, MERS/Economy Boat and Pedley & Gordinier.

He succeeded Mario Cordero as Chairman of the FMC, who left office in 2017. Khouri was first nominated to the commission by President Obama and confirmed by the U.S. Senate in December 2009. President Donald Trump named Michael A. Khouri as chairman on March 7, 2019.

See also
Daniel B. Maffei
Louis E. Sola
Rebecca F. Dye

References

Federal Maritime Commission members
Year of birth missing (living people)
Living people
Trump administration personnel
University of Louisville School of Law alumni
Tulane University alumni
American politicians of Lebanese descent